Alagoinhas is a city in the Brazilian state of Bahia. It was founded in 1852. In 1974, the city was made the seat of the Roman Catholic Diocese of Alagoinhas.

References 

Municipalities in Bahia